Asteracmea is a genus of true limpets, marine gastropod molluscs in the family Lottiidae.

Species
 Asteracmea axiaerata 
 Asteracmea illibrata (J. C. Verco, 1906)
 Asteracmea roseoradiata (J. C. Verco, 1912)
 Asteracmea stowae 
 Asteracmea suteri (Iredale, 1915)

References

 Powell A. W. B., New Zealand Mollusca, William Collins Publishers Ltd, Auckland, New Zealand 1979 

Lottiidae